2-Methylmethcathinone (2-MMC) is a recreational designer drug with stimulant effects. It is a substituted cathinone derivative, closely related to better known drugs such as 3-methylmethcathinone and 4-methylmethcathinone (mephedrone). It was first identified in Sweden in 2014, and has subsequently been reported in other European countries such as Poland and Spain.

See also 
 2-Me-PVP
 Ortetamine

References 

Cathinones
Designer drugs